Bruce Malcolm Light (26 June 1949 – 24 January 2018) was an Australian rules footballer who played for the Port Adelaide Football Club in the South Australian National Football League (SANFL). During his career he played four games for South Australia and won a premiership with Port Adelaide in 1977.
THE Port Adelaide Football Club mourns the passing of premiership wingman Bruce Light.

Light, who represented Port Adelaide in 216 games from 1967 to 1978, died on Tuesday night at the age of 68 after a long battle with illness.

Light was awarded Port Adelaide Life Membership in 1976 and played a pivotal role the following season in the club’s drought-breaking 1977 premiership.

His close friend and premiership captain Russell Ebert recalls a man who was adored by Port Adelaide supporters throughout the 1970s for his electrifying speed, courage and flowing blond hair.

“Bruce had the respect of everyone. Regardless of who you asked - Port Adelaide supporters, fellow teammates or casual observers - Bruce Light would invariably be in the top 3 for people’s favourite players during his career,” remembered Ebert.

“Bruce was different to wingman of that time. He loved being in the thick of the action and he had the courage to back it up. But he was also the fastest player I’ve ever seen which made him very popular with our supporters but not so popular with opposition wingman.”

In the book Dynasty, legendary Port Adelaide player and coach Fos Williams described Light as a “superior footballer”.

“He was courageous, he’d wave the ball around and get away with it and was just a natural showing the skills on both sides of his body,” said Williams.

Ebert fondly reflects on Light’s career noting his performance in State games versus Victoria as highlights along with his brilliant 1977 finals series for Port Adelaide. For Light, team success always overshadowed individual glory.

“Bruce was all about team success and triumph for the whole club. Along with his teammates, Bruce loved the trainers and volunteers at the club and always felt a real sense of responsibility toward the entire club and supporter base. And anyone who saw Bruce play would know he played like he carried that responsibility,” said Ebert.

For all the incredible football qualities Light possessed it was his friendship and willingness to help others that resonates most with Ebert.

“Bruce was a great friend. You often get asked about teammates you would go to war with and I know Bruce would be the first to put his hand up to be alongside you,” said Ebert.

“Footy was a vehicle for Bruce to do other things in life that were important to him and to help others. During his career, Bruce went back to study as a mature-aged student and got a teaching degree. One of his great passions was teaching and helping the children of Ashford Special School here in Adelaide to develop and achieve their goals and he spent more than a decade in that role.

“Beyond football, Bruce had many amazing qualities that a lot of people didn’t see and he’ll be sadly missed by all those who had the pleasure of knowing him.”

Everyone at the Port Adelaide Football Club passes on its condolences to the entire Light family

Bruce Light will be farewelled next week at a private service.

Port Adelaide will honour Light’s memory and outstanding contribution at Adelaide Oval in Round 1.  

Bruce Light

Playing record

216 games and 89 goals for Port Adelaide, 1967 to 1978

Premierships

Port Adelaide SANFL premiership player - 1977

State representation

4 games for South Australia

Achievements

Player life member of Port Adelaide 1976
 ref: PAFC

References

Port Adelaide Football Club (SANFL) players
Port Adelaide Football Club players (all competitions)
Australian rules footballers from South Australia
1949 births
2018 deaths